Mark Wadsworth may refer to:

 Marc Wadsworth, British political activist formerly a member of the Labour Party
 Mark Wadsworth (UKIP politician), British political activist formerly the treasurer for UKIP and now a member of the Young People's Party UK
 Mark Wadsworth (speedway rider), British grasstrack motorcyclist, multiple times British champion